RM Instow, also known as Arromanches Camp, is a military installation operated by the Royal Marines at Instow in North Devon located  south west of Barnstaple, Devon, and  north east of Bideford, Devon, England.

History
The site, which was established in 1939, was used as a training facility for troops preparing for the Normandy landings at Arromanches on Gold Beach in June 1944 during the Second World War. In the 1970s the towns of Instow and Arromanches instigated an arrangement whereby families visited each other's town every other year staying with a host family.

Operations
The site is occupied by 11 Amphibious Trials and Training Squadron, part of 1 Assault Group Royal Marines, which carries out training for operations which include disembarking from landing craft, wading across a water gap of up to 1.5m (4 ft 6 inches) in depth, an activity known as fording, and arriving at a beachhead. The site is also used for trialling new landing craft: the Royal Marines have been moving away from the use of flat-bottomed landing craft or DUKWs to armed powerboats. The site is available for filming.

References

Royal Marines bases
Royal Navy bases in England
Military history of Devon
1939 establishments in England